David Maney Currin, Sr. (November 11, 1817 – March 25, 1864) was a Tennessee attorney and politician who served in the Confederate States Congress during the American Civil War.

Biography
Currin was born in Murfreesboro, Tennessee, in 1817. He married Letitia Irby Watson on December 16, 1845, in Wiliamson County.

A Democrat, he served in the House of Representatives during the 29th General Assembly (1851–53) representing Fayette, Hardeman, and Shelby counties.

Following the state's ordinance of secession and the outbreak of the Civil War, he was a delegate from Tennessee to the Confederate Provisional Congress, 1861–62. He then represented his Middle Tennessee district in the First Confederate Congress. A Nashville newspaper wrote, "Hon. D. M. Currin was returned from his district. He deservedly ranks highest as a politician and is as disinterested a patriot as lives. He is a man of good ability and will make a worthy, active and efficient representative."

He served in the First and Second Confederate Congresses from 1862 until his death in Richmond, Virginia, March 25, 1864.

Notes

References
 Robert M. McBride and Dan M. Robinson, eds., Biographical Directory of the Tennessee General Assembly, Volume I, 1796–1861. (Nashville: Tennessee State Library and Archives and Tennessee Historical Commission, 1975).

External links

Members of the Confederate House of Representatives from Tennessee
19th-century American politicians
Deputies and delegates to the Provisional Congress of the Confederate States
Democratic Party members of the Tennessee House of Representatives
Tennessee lawyers
1817 births
1864 deaths
People from Murfreesboro, Tennessee
19th-century American lawyers